Bothalapalem is a village in Palakeedu mandal, Suryapet district in Telangana state, India. It is located 50 km from District headquarters,  Suryapet and 15 km from Deccan cement Factory and Penna Cement Factory .
The total population of the village is about 2,074 among which 55% are males. The number of voters in the village is 1,724.

Geography

Bothalapalem is located at  It has an average elevation of 245 metres (791 ft).

Education

In this village, there is a Primary School. The high school is Zilla Parishad High School (ZPHS), established in 2006. This co-ed school is affiliated with Telangana Board of Secondary Education (BSETS). Zilla Parishad High School (ZPHS), Bothalapalem is a higher secondary. It is owned and operated by the Local Body.

It believes in overall development of the students by balancing academics, extra curricular activities, sports in the state of art infrastructure within the campus. The school offers playgrounds for cricket, basketball, volleyball, table tennis, badminton and other sports. The admission process for this school starts every year in the month of May and school starts in July.

Politics
Bothalapalem comes under Huzurnagar Assembly constituency which become a separate assembly constituency with the delimitation in 2009 elections. First MLA is captain N. Uttam Kumar reddy. It is politically active village. People are politically active and support political parties with due diligence.

In the 2019 Bothalapalem Sarpanch elections, the TRS Party Supporters (Bogala Veera Reddy) alliance with CPM (AnanthaPrakash Kandagatla) Supporters in the Village. The Indian National Congress Party Supporter (Pinnelli Upender Rao) contested alone, Bharatiya Janata Party Supporters ( Saida Hussain Shaik) also Contested alone.

An independent candidate Meera Hussen Shaik, contested to promote his ideology and constitutions.

He expressed that tried to enrich the political scenario in Village with its true spirit. He distributed 3000 leaflets in the village stating that he would undertake 25 development works for the village people along with 15 development works requested by the Abyudaya Committee Bothalapalem to create a true and faithful political picture in Bothalapalem Village without involving unlawful money, liquor, and caste in elections.

Results: 
An alliance of TRS supporters with the CPM & Contestant Bogala Veera Reddy was elected as the village sarpanch by the people of the village with a majority.

Leaders of political parties are:

Congress: Ande Chinna Mallaiah, Keetha Srinivas, Bogala Rama Narasimha Reddy, Suroju Ravi.

Houses of worship

Houses of worship in the village include Anjaneyaswami Temple, Ganga Temple, a Christian church and Ramalayam Mosque (Majid E Hussaini). A temple of Veera Brahmam Ganga is under construction.

Festivals

The Bodrai Festival (బొడ్రాయి పండుగ) was celebrated on 19, 20 and 21 November 2005 in Bothalapalem. All the villagers offered clothes to their daughters. No meat was eaten by villagers during the festival.

The spring festival of Dassera is also celebrated in this village. Other major Hindu festivals include Ugadi, Sri Ramanavami, Vinayaka Chavithi, Holi, Sri Krishna Janmashtami, Deepavali, Sankranti, and Maha Sivaratri.

Yadavs of this village celebrate Gangamma Jathara every year. It is a very ancient tradition that came from their ancestors.

Muslims in this village celebrate Eid-ul-Fitr, Eid al-Adha, Ramadan (ninth month of the Islamic calendar), Milad-un-Nabi (Mawlid) and Muharram (Day of Ashura). These are usually greeted with great pomp and ceremony. Christians in this village celebrate Christmas and Good Friday.

Economy

The village is depends on the Nagarjuna Sagar left canal, and the village economy is based on rice cultivation. 90% of the economy of the village is from rice and daily wages and other sources  like Pond but now those were not generating economy for village.

Facilities

Village has one Zilla parshath High School and Primary school and Two Anganvadi schools.
A two lane blacktop road was constructed in 2009.

Transport
 Bothalapalem village is well-connected by bus transport. 
 Bothalapalem to Neredcherla every one hour bus transport available. 
 Morning bus services are available to Hyderabad daily.
 Telugu-Velugu Bus Services is available to nearby villages.
 Bothalapalem turned to green because of lots of youth.

External links
Telangana People's Struggle and Its Lessons - Page 161
Official Website of the Nalgonda District
Third Ordinary Election Results, MPP 2006

This article is a stub. You can help Wikipedia by expanding it.

Villages in Suryapet district